IRAS may refer to:
 Indian Railway Accounts Service
 Infrared Astronomical Satellite
 Inland Revenue Authority of Singapore
 Iras, a character in Antony and Cleopatra; see List of Shakespearean characters

See also
 IRA (disambiguation)